The College of Our Lady of the Elms, often called Elms College, is a private Roman Catholic college in Chicopee, Massachusetts.

History 
The Sisters of St. Joseph and the Diocese of Springfield co-founded Elms as a girls' preparatory academy in Pittsfield, Massachusetts, the Academy of Our Lady of the Elms, in 1897. In 1899, Rev. John McCoy and Bishop Thomas Beaven of the Springfield diocese purchased property in Chicopee and it became St. Joseph's Normal College.

In 1927, the Sisters of Saint Joseph petitioned the Commonwealth of Massachusetts to charter the school as a women's liberal arts college with a specialization in education, the charter was approved in 1928, and the name was changed to the College of Our Lady of the Elms with Rev. Thomas Michael O'Leary as the first president. Through the efforts of the Sisters of St. Joseph and the Springfield diocesan clergy, the curriculum was expanded through the 1940s and 1950s, and in 1953, an evening program was established.

To meet the needs of the surrounding community, Elms developed undergraduate programs in nursing, business management, and communication sciences and disorders during the 1960s and 1970s. In the late 1980s, Weekend College, paralegal studies and legal studies, and a Master of Arts degree program in teaching were instituted.

In 1994 Elms College opened the Maguire Center for Health, Fitness, and Athletics that includes an aerobics/weight room, a 25-meter handicapped-accessible six-lane pool, a wood-floored gymnasium, an elevated rubberized 100-meter track, a sports medicine facility, a laundry room, and four locker rooms.

The Elms College board of trustees voted 23–5 to begin admitting men, starting with the 1998–1999 school year, on October 7, 1997.

Campus 

The campus is about two miles north of Metro Center Springfield, Massachusetts. It is focused on the Keating Quadrangle, which lies at its center, and has 14 buildings. In 2014, Elms College completed construction on the Center for Natural and Health Sciences, its first academic building in more than 30 years.

Academics
Elms offers thirty-three academic majors to 814 full-time undergraduate students, and it employs 67 full-time faculty members.

Academically, the college is divided into the division of business, division of communication sciences and disorders, division of education, division of humanities and fine arts, division of natural sciences, mathematics and technology, and division of social sciences.

In 2013, the division of nursing became the school of nursing.

Student body 
In 2020 the school had about 1,100 students at the undergraduate level, with about 40% eligible for Pell grants. Fred Thys of WBUR wrote that year that "Elms caters to many students who are the first in their family to go to college."

Student life 
Traditions include Elms Night, an event in the beginning of the fall semester to welcome incoming first-year students. The event starts with an outdoor dinner where all Elms students and staff are invited. Freshmen are encouraged by seniors to sing a few lyrics from a song of choice during dinner. Following dinner, everyone meets in the Berchman's Hall Rotunda. Each class is assigned a pop song and sings for the other classes. At this point in the evening, seniors toss items from the second floor balcony to the freshmen on the first floor. Traditionally, the items were beanie caps. Now they vary from towels to wallets or other items. Often an Elms College student will keep this item at least until they graduate.

Athletics
The Elms College Blazers got their nickname from an old tradition when sophomore students would receive 'blazers' to wear as a seniority right. Although this tradition has long since been discontinued, the team name has stuck.

The Elms College Blazers team colors are green, gold, and white. Elms competes in the New England Collegiate Conference - NECC at the Division III level as part of the National Collegiate Athletic Association in baseball, basketball, cross-country, golf, soccer, softball, volleyball, field hockey, lacrosse, and swimming. The athletics at Elms are based out of The Maguire Center.

Cultural affiliations

Elms College is the seat of two non-profit organizations that promote the arts and cultures of two ethnic communities that have historically immigrated to Western Massachusetts.

The Irish Cultural Center of Western New England
The Polish Center for Discovery & Learning at Elms College

Notable faculty
 Paul Jenkins, professor of poetry
 Thomas Michael O'Leary, co-founder and first president of Elms College
 John Elder Robison, adjunct professor, autistic author of two books, brother of Augusten Burroughs
 Christopher Joseph Weldon, president of Elms College from 1958 to 1977

Notable alumni
 Joan Hartley, Connecticut politician, Deputy President Pro Tempore of the Connecticut State Senate
 Mike Lima, USL Premier Development League soccer player

References

External links
Official website
Official athletics website

 
Sisters of Saint Joseph colleges and universities
Buildings and structures in Chicopee, Massachusetts
Educational institutions established in 1928
Former women's universities and colleges in the United States
Catholic universities and colleges in Massachusetts
Universities and colleges in Hampden County, Massachusetts
New England Collegiate Conference schools
1928 establishments in Massachusetts